Okolona School District was a school district in Clark and Pike counties in Arkansas, headquartered in Okolona. It was dissolved on July 1, 1987; portions of the district were absorbed by the Amity, Arkadelphia, Delight, and Gurdon school districts.

References

Further reading
Maps of the Okolona district
  (Download)
  (Download)

Defunct school districts in Arkansas
Education in Clark County, Arkansas
Education in Pike County, Arkansas
School districts disestablished in 1987
1987 disestablishments in Arkansas